The Mark 15 nuclear bomb, or Mk-15, was a 1950s American thermonuclear bomb, the first relatively lightweight thermonuclear bomb created by the United States.

A total of 1,200 Mark 15 bombs were produced from 1955 to 1957. There were three production variants: Mod 1, Mod 2, and Mod 3. The design was in service from 1955 to 1965.

Specifications

Models
The Mod 1 corresponds to the Castle Nectar test of the Zombie weapon prototype.

Redwing Cherokee was the first US thermonuclear bomb airdrop test.

The Mod 3 also appears to have had a  yield.

W15
A missile warhead variant of the Mark 15, the W15 Warhead, was an ongoing project in the mid 1950s.  It was canceled in early 1957.  Before cancellation, it had been intended for use on the SM-62 Snark missile.  Instead, the Snark ended up using the W39 (see below).

Derivatives
The W39 nuclear warhead and B39 nuclear bomb used a common nuclear physics package which was derived from the Mark 15.  The experimental W39 devices were initially tested as the TX-15-X3 (which is identical to the W39 Mod 0 design).

Dropped and lost

On February 5, 1958, during a training mission flown by a B-47, a Mk 15 nuclear bomb  was lost off the coast of Tybee Island, Georgia near Savannah.

See also
 List of nuclear weapons
 Operation Castle
 Operation Redwing

References

External links

 Allbombs.html list of all US nuclear warheads at nuclearweaponarchive.org

Cold War aerial bombs of the United States
Nuclear bombs of the United States
Military equipment introduced in the 1950s